The 1917 VPI Gobblers football team represented the Virginia Polytechnic Institute in the 1917 college football season. The team was led by their head coach Charles Bernier and finished with a record of six wins, two losses and one tie (6–2–1).

Schedule

Players
The following players were members of the 1917 football team according to the roster published in the 1918 edition of The Bugle, the Virginia Tech yearbook.

Game summaries

Hampden–Sydney

The starting lineup for VPI was: Hardwick (left end), H. Parrish (left tackle), McNeil (left guard), Currie (center), Young (right guard), Crisp (right tackle), Younger (right end), E. Roden (quarterback), Peyton (left halfback), Benner (right halfback), Godsey (fullback). The substitutes were: Lester, B. Parrish, D. Roden, Wiegel and Willis.

Emory and Henry
The starting lineup for VPI was: Powers (left end), H. Parrish (left tackle), McNeil (left guard), Currie (center), Lester (right guard), Rangely (right tackle), D. Roden (right end), Bock (quarterback), Wiegel (left halfback), Benner (right halfback), Crisp (fullback). The substitutes were: Charles, Godsey, Hardwick, Lybrook, Matthews, Mckann, Miller, Robinson, Thornton, Ward, Wills, Yates and Young.

Davidson
The starting lineup for VPI was: Hardwick (left end), H. Parrish (left tackle), McNeil (left guard), Currie (center), Younger (right guard), Crisp (right tackle), Lester (right end), Lybrook (quarterback), Wiegel (left halfback), Benner (right halfback), Godsey (fullback). The substitutes were: Miller, Peyton, D. Roden and E. Roden.

Georgetown
The starting lineup for VPI was: Hardwick (left end), H. Parrish (left tackle), McNeil (left guard), Currie (center), Lester (right guard), Crisp (right tackle), Younger (right end), E. Roden (quarterback), Peyton (left halfback), Benner (right halfback), Godsey (fullback). The substitutes were: Rangely, D. Roden and Yates.

Wake Forest
The starting lineup for VPI was: D. Roden (left end), H. Parrish (left tackle), Yates (left guard), Currie (center), Rangely (right guard), McNeil (right tackle), Younger (right end), E. Roden (quarterback), Peyton (left halfback), Benner (right halfback), Crisp (fullback). The substitutes were: Bock, Eldridge, Godsey, Hitchens, Lybrook, Miller, Thornton and Will.

West Virginia
The starting lineup for VPI was: D. Roden (left end), McNeil (left tackle), Lester (left guard), Currie (center), Rangely (right guard), Crisp (right tackle), Younger (right end), E. Roden (quarterback), Bock (left halfback), Benner (right halfback), Godsey (fullback). The substitutes were: Miller, Peyton and Will.

North Carolina A&M
The starting lineup for VPI was: D. Roden (left end), McNeil (left tackle), Lester (left guard), Currie (center), Rangely (right guard), Crisp (right tackle), Younger (right end), E. Roden (quarterback), Bock (left halfback), Benner (right halfback), Godsey (fullback). The substitutes were: Peyton.

Roanoke
The starting lineup for VPI was: D. Roden (left end), McNeil (left tackle), Yates (left guard), Miller (center), Hitchens (right guard), Rangely (right tackle), Thornton (right end), Lybrook (quarterback), Bock (left halfback), Godsey (right halfback), Crisp (fullback).

VMI
The starting lineup for VPI was: D. Roden (left end), H. Parrish (left tackle), McNeil (left guard), Currie (center), Lester (right guard), Crisp (right tackle), Younger (right end), E. Roden (quarterback), Bock (left halfback), Benner (right halfback), Godsey (fullback). The substitutes were: Peyton.

References

VPI
Virginia Tech Hokies football seasons
VPI Gobblers football